Daniel Faraldo (born June 10, 1977), known professionally as Dan-e-o, is a Canadian hip hop artist and actor of Jamaican and Spanish descent. In June 2015, Dan-e-o received the award for Best Hip Hop Artist at the Black Canadian Awards. He is a member of the groups Monolith and Perfeck Strangers, both based in Scarborough, Ontario.

Early career 
Born in Toronto, Canada, Dan-e-o won a contest on the television dance show, Electric Circus, at the age of 13 and went on to become a consistent winner of rap battles and talent show contests. His recording career was officially launched in 1996 when his first single "Dear Hip Hop" was featured on Beat Factory/EMI's, RapEssentials Volume One compilation. The track is now considered by many to be a Canadian hip-hop classic. Dan-e-o helped to establish his crew, Monolith in 1997 by co-founding One Rock Records and independently releasing the EP, The Long Awaited... the following year. With two videos, "At The T.O.P." and "Plan Eh", this project helped put Dan-e-o and the 10-member Monolith crew permanently on the hip-hop map.

Rap competitions and awards 
In May 1991, Dan-e-o performed live on Electric Circus and won a rap-off competition. The win sparked his career as a professional hip-hop artist.

Dan-e-o won the Darknights Freestyle Battle in July 2003 in Markham, Ontario, defeating Detroit's Swann in the finals.

On June 6, 2015, Dan-e-o won the Best Hip Hop Artist award at the Black Canadian Awards in Toronto, Ontario.

2000s
In 2000, Dan-e-o released his debut album, The Book of Daniel. It included the singles "Corrida De Toros", "Margerine" and "Baahd!". In 2004, Dan-e-o's second album, See No Evil, Hear No Evil was released containing the singles "T.N.T.", "Funkbox", "Deadly" and "Kama Sutra" which features Dan-e-o's cousin and dancehall star, Red Rat. Its music video currently has over 8 million views on YouTube. Over the course of the next several years, Dan-e-o released numerous mixtapes, including Dilla Pickles - a full length tribute CD to producer J Dilla. Dan-e-o also launched his acting career.

Acting career
With a number of TV commercials under his belt, Dan-e-o (using his real name, Daniel Faraldo) landed a bit role in an episode of the A&E series, Breakout Kings in 2011, played a key role in his first full-length movie, Anything Goes that same year and starred in 2014's Tapped Out. His next feature-length film, titled Lifechanger was released in 2018.

Album releases
"Dear Hip Hop", one of Dan-e-o's most well known songs, was released on Beat Factory's Rap Essentials Volume One album in 1996. The CD included artists from all over Canada that have at one point toured Canada with Dan-e-o including Rascalz, Kardinal Offishall and Choclair. In 1998, on One Rock Records, a label he helped to found the year before, Dan-e-o released an EP entitled The Long Awaited with his group Monolith.

In 2000, Dan-e-o released his debut album, The Book of Daniel on the same label.

In 2004, he released the See No Evil, Hear No Evil album on the newly named Planet Rock Records imprint. This album featured a hybrid style which composed of funk, soul, reggae and rock along with Dan-e-o's freestyle lyricism.

On Planet Rock Records, Dan-e-o has also released mixtapes/albums entitled Dear Hip Hop in 2004, containing recordings from the 90s and Speak No Evil in 2005, a remix edition of his sophomore effort.

On January 9, 2009, Dan-e-o, as part of Tha O Show, released OBLIVION! Tha Indy Wrestling Album, an album containing theme songs of several Ontario indy professional wrestlers that features performances from himself, T.J. Habibi, Chemist, Tika Simone and Summer Brockwell.

In November 2009, Dan-e-o released a 2 in 1 album/mixtape entitled Dilla Pickles in honor of the late hip-hop producer, J Dilla. The project contains such tracks as "Break It Down", "Last Minute" and "Locked" and includes performances by himself, Famous, Ian Kamau, marveL, Promise and others.

In 2012, together with Promise, Dan-e-o released his first album as part of the duo, Perfeck Strangers entitled Series Premiere on URBNET Records.

In 2013, Dan-e-o released an EP Immortal and an album Inevitable through URBNET Records. For these projects, he worked with such artists as Moka Only, Big Kish, Maestro Fresh-Wes, Red Rat, Pascalle, Chip Fu and Rich Kidd. 

In 2014, Dan-e-o finally released the Dear Hip Hop album as a vinyl-only release through France's Sergent Records.

In 2017, URBNET Records released a deluxe version of the album entitled Dear Hip Hop: 20 Years Later to commemorate the two-decade milestone of the release of Dan-e-o's debut single.

In 2019, Dan-e-o released his fifth solo album, The Day It All Changed, an ode to his daughter, Melina, who appears on the album cover with him.

Tha O Show 
In mid-February 2006, Dan-e-o joined with friend, Big Daddy Donnie to launch Tha O Show, a website based in Toronto. In the beginning, it consisted of articles and weekly reviews of professional wrestling and mixed martial arts shows, but later on would turn into what the pair had envisioned all along: a weekly online radio program that broadcasts on Tha O Show's website and on dozens of affiliate sites.  The show carved out a niche as a unique radio property, catering to an audience that loves wrestling and MMA, but wanted to hear about other things as well.  The show often featured an in-studio guest or co-host who was a professional wrestler, as well as guests on the phone. Dan-e-o also wrote and performed the lyrics to Gangrel's entrance theme during this time. Tha O Show avoids typical "interview" format and instead strives for a more conversational approach - best noted by their Round Table segment.
Dan-e-o stepped down in June 2012 as official co-host of Tha O Show, being replaced by professional wrestler and Big Daddy Donnie's former co-host on Live Audio Wrestling, Notorious T.I.D.. Tha O Show officially went off the air by the end of 2013. In March 2020, amid the coronavirus pandemic, Donnie, Tid and Dan reunited with a new podcast known as "The Godfathers of Podcasting".

Discography

Dan-e-o has released and/or appeared on the following albums and mixtapes:
 Rap Essentials Volume One (1996)
 World Of Rap Volume 2 (1997)
 La Constellation - Dualité (1998)
 Monolith - The Long Awaited...EP (1998)
 Prime Time The Original Soundtrack (1999)
 Fit For Survival Volume 1 (2000)
 Rap Essentials 2000 (2000)
 Mastermind - Volume 49: The Set Up (2000)
 Mastermind - Volume 50: Street Legal (2000)
 The Book of Daniel (2000)
 RapEssentials 2001 (2001)
 Urbnet.com/hiphopmix V1 (2001)
 Classified - Union Dues (2001)
 Abdominal & DJ Fase - Flowtation Device (2001)
 Underground Hip Hop Volume 1 (2002)
 Irs - Welcome To Planet Irs (2003)
 Divo - The Evolution Theory (2003)
 Jack Hammer Vol.1 - Blazin' 04 (2004)
 Jack Hammer Vol 2. - Wickedness Baahdness (2004)
 Arythmetic - The Mixtape (2004)
 Grimace Love - Fire In The Streets Vol.1 (2004)
 Nish Raawks - Buck Canuck (2004)
 See No Evil, Hear No Evil (2004)
 Underground Hip Hop Vol.3 (2005)
 Grimace Love - Fire In The Streets Vol.2 (2005)
 Yor123 & Skandaali - Round The World (2005)
 Speak No Evil (2005)
 Rishaard - Confessions Of A Prick!? (2006)
 Monolith - Welcome To Scarborough (2006)
 Dub J - Love 2 Hate Vol.1 (2006)
 DJ Law - Northern Exposure Vol.1 (2007)
 Grimace Love - The Zig Zag Man (2007)
 The Art Of Lyricism: Dan-e-o's Finest (2007)
 Wio-K - In Real Life (2007)
 The Bakery Mixtape (2008)
 Monolith - The Long Awaited (10 Year Anniversary) (2008)
 10 The Music Videos DVD (2008)
 Grimace Love - Perception (2009)
 OBLIVION! Tha Indy Wrestling Album (2009)
 2010 Canadian Rap Future Superstars (2009)
 Hip Hop Lives Vol.2 - The Addiction (2009)
 Ian Kamau - September Nine Mixtape Vol.2 (2009)
 Dilla Pickles (2009)
 Tru North Risin' Vol.1 (2010)
 The Book of Daniel (10 Year Anniversary Mixtape) (2010)
 Ron Contour - Rontario (2010)
 Sikadime - Carpe Noctem (2010)
 The Borough Most Thorough (2010)
 Phase 2 Collective - Devastating (2011)
 Spesh K - BSH Warm Up Show (2011)
 Sep & Khan Soulo - The Nightmare Project (2011)
 Underground Hip-Hop Volume 7 (2011)
 Perfeck Strangers - Series Premiere (2012)
 S-KY THE COOKINJAX - ReMAKIN (2012)
 SepTo - T.O. For Toronto (2012)
 URBNET Certified Vol. 2 (2012)
 Immortal (2013)
 Inevitable (2013) 
 iLLvibe - Proof Of Life (2014)
 L.I.U. - 2 Raw 4 Tha Radio (2014)
 Blaq Roche - Project: Blaq Roche (2014)
 Dear Hip Hop (vinyl only) (2004)
 Underground Hip Hop Vol.8 (2015)
 Divo & GMJ - Transatlantic Soul (2015)
 Ultra Magnus & DJ SLAM! - Magnus Opus (2016)
 Dear Hip Hop: 20 Years Later (2017)
 The Day It All Changed (2019)
 ''S-KY THE COOKINJAX - Still (2019)
 The Day It All Changed (Lockdown Remixes) (2020)
 V.A. HOW MANY BEATZ 03' (2020)
 Ranaman - Tabula Rasa''' (2020)

References

External links 

Dan-e-o's Official Site

1977 births
Living people
Canadian people of Jamaican descent
Canadian people of Spanish descent
Black Canadian musicians
Canadian male rappers
People from Scarborough, Toronto
Rappers from Toronto
20th-century Canadian rappers
21st-century Canadian rappers
20th-century Canadian male musicians
21st-century Canadian male musicians